Juri Fazi (born 3 July 1961) is an Italian judoka. He competed at the 1984 Summer Olympics and the 1988 Summer Olympics.

References

External links
 

1961 births
Living people
Italian male judoka
Olympic judoka of Italy
Judoka at the 1984 Summer Olympics
Judoka at the 1988 Summer Olympics
Mediterranean Games medalists in judo
Mediterranean Games gold medalists for Italy
Mediterranean Games bronze medalists for Italy
Competitors at the 1983 Mediterranean Games
Competitors at the 1987 Mediterranean Games
People from Pesaro
Sportspeople from the Province of Pesaro and Urbino
20th-century Italian people
21st-century Italian people